Lesley Harris was a New Zealand netball player who represented her country at the inaugural 1963 World Netball Championships

Lesley Harris (née Baker) was born on 8 October 1938 and lived in Matamata in the Waikato region of New Zealand's North Island. She married Graham Harris who taught at Matamata College. She played wing defence for the Matamata netball team and was chosen to represent New Zealand in the inaugural world championships in Eastbourne, England. Her first match for the Silver Ferns was against Sri Lanka and she played in half of the team's games, being in competition with Elva Simpson for a place on the team. New Zealand finished runners-up, after losing 37-36 to Australia.

References

1938 births
Living people
Sportspeople from Matamata
New Zealand international netball players
New Zealand netball players
1963 World Netball Championships players